Thomas Michael DiBiagio is a former United States Attorney in the state of Maryland. After eight U.S. attorneys were fired by the Bush administration in 2006 for performance-related issues under a  clause of the PATRIOT Act (see Dismissal of U.S. attorneys controversy), DiBiagio stated in March 2007 that he was ousted because of political pressure over public corruption investigations into the administration of then-Gov. Robert L. Ehrlich Jr.

However, he had also faced criticism in his office's handling of the John Allen Muhammad arrest in the D. C. sniper attacks.  He ordered FBI agents to effect a federal arrest to gain jurisdiction over the local police task forces who had been leading the investigation.  This arrest permanently stopped the local police task force's interrogation of the defendants. The snipers' motives would never be known.

References

 Baltimore Sun, Matthew Dolan, Andrew A. Green and Matthew Hay Brown; Ex-boss disputes DiBiagio's story, March 7, 2007
 New York Times, Eric Lichtblau; Ex-Prosecutor Says Departure Was Pressured, March 6, 2007
 Baltimore Sun, Matthew Dolan; DiBiagio essay stirs Md. legal community, January 28, 2006
 Baltimore Sun,  Smear tactics keep dreamers out of public service, January 26, 2006
 Baltimore Sun, Matthew Dolan; New U.S. attorney to have first big test, October 25, 2005
 Baltimore Sun, Stephanie Hanes; U.S. Attorney DiBiagio resigns, December 4, 2004
 Baltimore Sun, Scott Calvert; High-profile victories and public stumbles, December 4, 2004
 Baltimore Business Journal, Tina Johnson-Marcel; A Conversation With... Thomas M. DiBiagio, United States Attorney, District of Maryland, August 16, 2002

Living people
Dismissal of U.S. attorneys controversy
United States Attorneys for the District of Maryland
1960 births